The W73 was a planned nuclear warhead for the AGM-53 Condor air to surface missile and designed by Los Alamos Scientific Laboratory (now Los Alamos National Laboratory). The W73 warhead was cancelled in 1970 in favor of a purely conventional warhead for Condor. Condor was approved for production in 1975 with a expected production run of 250 missiles, but was cancelled in early 1976 due to high cost.

Condor was to weigh  at launch and carry a  warhead. It is unclear if the weight given is for the conventional or nuclear-armed version of the Condor.

See also
 List of nuclear weapons
 B61 Family

References

Nuclear warheads of the United States